Quebo is a town located in the Tombali Region of Guinea-Bissau. Population 6,195 (2008 est).

It is served by Quebo Airport.

References

Tombali Region
Populated places in Guinea-Bissau
Sectors of Guinea-Bissau